The 2019 Thai League 4 Northeastern region is a region in the regional stage of the 2019 Thai League 4. A total of 13 teams located in Northeastern of Thailand will compete in the league of the Northeastern region.

Teams

Number of teams by province

Stadiums and locations

League table

Standings

Positions by round

Notes:* The reserve of T1 and T2 teams, also known as team (B) could not qualified and relegated, so that the teams in lower or upper positions would be qualified or relegated.

Results by round

Results
For the Northeastern region, a total 24 matches per team competing in 2 legs.

Season statistics

Top scorers by team

Attendance

Overall statistics

Attendance by home match played

Source: Thai League
Note: Some error of T4 official match report 20 April 2019 (Surin City 2–1 Sakon Nakhon). Some error of T4 official match report 25 May 2019 (Nongbua Pitchaya (B) 2–2 Kalasin). Some error of T4 official match report 25 May 2019 (Surin Sugar Khong Chee Mool 2–3 Buriram United (B)).

See also
 2019 Thai League 1
 2019 Thai League 2
 2019 Thai League 3
 2019 Thai League 4
 2019 Thailand Amateur League
 2019 Thai FA Cup
 2019 Thai League Cup
 2019 Thailand Champions Cup

References

External links
 Official website of Thai League

4